Christopher Lawrence (born 30 March 1968) is an Australian windsurfer. He competed in the Division II event at the 1988 Summer Olympics.

 Australian Windsurfing Champion 
 European Windsurfing Champion
 World Youth Windsurfing Champion
 6 X World Windsurfing Champion

References

External links
 
 
 
 

1968 births
Living people
Australian windsurfers
Australian male sailors (sport)
Olympic sailors of Australia
Sailors at the 1988 Summer Olympics – Division II
Sportsmen from New South Wales